Acharya ( is a 2022 Indian Telugu-language action drama film written and directed by Koratala Siva. Produced by Konidela Production Company and Matinee Entertainment, the film stars Chiranjeevi as the titular character alongside Ram Charan, Pooja Hegde and Sonu Sood. The film tells the story of Acharya, a Naxalite leader who enters a shrine named Dharmasthali to put an end to the oppression caused by a local politician named Basava. Sidda confronts drugs and harassments inside the sanctum. Despite this, Sidda may have to work with the Naxalites in the event of unforeseen circumstances. The film has music composed by Mani Sharma and cinematography by Tirru.

The film was launched in October 2019. Principal photography began in January 2020 and suffered delays due to the COVID-19 pandemic. 

Acharya was released theatrically on 29 April 2022 and opened to generally highly negative reviews. It was a commercial failure, grossing  crore over a budget of  crore.

Plot
Dharmasthali and adjoining hamlet of Padaghattam are Temple towns, which are surrounded by the Siddhavanam forest. Dharmasthali and Padaghattam are interlinked by their values and faith to the goddess, Gattamma. Dharmasthali operates under the tyrannical rule of Basava, the local municipal chairman. He intends to give the lands of Dharmasthali and Padaghattam to Rathod and his brother for mining purposes. The people of Padaghattam, who are known for their expertise in Ayurvedic medicine, start visiting Dharmasthali less frequently due to Basava's cruel regime.

Acharya who is a naxal, arrives in Dharmasthali in the guise of a carpenter. He starts retaliating for the atrocities committed by Basava to the villagers. It is revealed that Acharya came to Dharmasthali to fulfill his best friend, Siddha's promise where he reveals about Siddha's past and origin to Dharmasthali villagers. In the past, Siddha is a disciple of the local Gurukul and a strong advocate for Dharma. Apart from him, Basava and the other men of the village study with him in the Gurukul. Basava hatches a plan with Rathod's brother and his friend to destroy the village's Gattamma Temple, under the guise of flooding from torrential rain to start mining. Siddha discovers Basava's plan and attacks the trio on the night they plan to destroy the temple. He is gravely injured in the ensuing chaos, when Acharya's squad arrives to his rescue where they take him away to the nearby Siddhavanam forest, for his recuperation where Acharya reveals where Siddha is actually from. Siddha was born to Comrade Shankar, Acharya's naxal squadron leader, and in a shootout with the local law enforcement, Siddha's parents are both killed. Before dying, a young Acharya promises Shankar to raise Siddha with awareness about their fight for Dharma.

To protect him, Acharya hands the newborn Siddha over to Adanna, to be brought up in Dharmasthali. However, Acharya watches and protects Siddha from afar, as he grows up. Siddha learns of his origins and is willingly initiated into Acharya's naxal squad. During a mission in rescuing the children of Adivasis who were forcibly taken away by Rathod's men for child labour in his mines, Siddha comes across a map of lands to be blasted for mining purposes which includes the lands around Padaghattam and Dharmasthali. When Siddha goes back to his village to stop the mining, he comes across Rathod's henchmen under the orders of Rathod, to kill Acharya's squad. While trying to finish them with Acharya, Siddha is shot and killed by Rathod's henchman, Khilla, before he is killed by Acharya. Before dying, Acharya promises to Siddha that he will protect the village and stop the illegal mining planned by Basava and Rathod.

After the reveal of Siddha's past, Acharya is arrested by the local police, while Basava and Rathod hatch a plan to wipe out the entire village during Gattamma's festival. Meanwhile, Acharya's squad manage to break him out of the police convoy while he is being taken away. He then kills each and every one of Rathod's henchmen and Rathod's brother before killing both Rathod and Basava. After coming to terms with Siddha's demise, Acharya bids his farewell to Padaghattam and Dharmasthali and goes back to the forest with his squad to continue Siddha's legacy of upholding Dharma and their fight.

Cast

Production

Development 
The film was launched on 8 October 2019 with the working title of #Chiru152 on Vijayadashami festival, being the first collaboration of Koratala Siva and Chiranjeevi. Chiranjeevi accidentally revealed the title as Acharya during audio launch of the film O Pitta Katha in March 2020.

Mani Sharma is the music composer. Cinematography and editing is performed respectively by Tirru and Naveen Nooli. Suresh Selvarajan is the art director.

In January 2022, Asianet News reported that the film's storyline is based on the Naxalite movement in Srikakulam district, led by poet and cultural activist Subbarao Panigrahi.

Casting 
Trisha was cast as the lead but exited later, citing creative differences, and eventually was replaced by Kajal Aggarwal. Reportedly, Mahesh Babu was offered the cameo role in the film. However, Chiranjeevi later confirmed his son Ram Charan for the role; Koratala adjusted the role to make it full-fledged. In an interview with Variety, Charan who plays Sidhha, said “It’s a 40-minute role, it’s pretty much the whole of the second half."

Pooja Hegde was cast as Neelambari opposite Charan, has an extended cameo. Regina Cassandra was signed for a special song in March 2020. Mahesh Babu has given narration for this film.

Filming 
Principal photography began in January 2020. Important portions were shot with Chiranjeevi and others at Ramoji Film City. The filming was going at a brisk pace until suspension in March 2020 due to COVID-19 pandemic. Filming was resumed in November 2020, and Aggarwal joined the sets in December 2020 in Hyderabad. A temple town set spanning 20 acres was built for the film.

Charan joined the production in January 2021. The film team reached Rajahmundry the same month. In March 2021, Pooja Hegde shot her portions with a montage song at a specially-constructed set in Maredumilli. A schedule took place at Singareni coal mines, Yellandu later that month. Owing to the second wave of COVID-19 pandemic, the filming was paused again and later resumed in July 2021 at a village set in Hyderabad. Both Ram Charan and Chiranjeevi resumed shooting their portions that month. Except for two songs, the rest of shoot was finished in August 2021.

Following her pregnancy in September 2021, Aggarwal requested the makers to complete her portions at the earliest. It is reported she subsequently opted out of the project owing to the delays in shoot and has not re-joined the production since. However, in April 2022, Koratala stated that Aggarwal's scenes were cut from the final draft of the film as he felt that the role she played could not match her stature.

Legal issues 
In August 2020, writer Rajesh Manduri alleged that Acharya was plagiarized from his script. He supposedly narrated the story to production house Mythri Movie Makers a few years ago which did not materialize. Mythri Movie Makers refuted the allegation, calling it a "gimmick." Matinee Entertainment stated that any such claims were baseless, iterating that the story of Acharya belongs to Koratala. Koratala responded that his story had no resemblance to Manduri's.

Music

The film's soundtrack album is composed by Mani Sharma.

Release

Theatrical 
Acharya was released theatrically on 29 April 2022. Earlier, it was scheduled to release on 13 May 2021, but was pushed back due to production delays and the COVID-19 pandemic in India. In October 2021, it was announced that the film would release 4 February 2022. In January 2022, it was then pushed to 1 April 2022 due to the increasing number of COVID-19 cases, fuelled by the SARS-CoV-2 Omicron variant. Later that month, it was pushed back to 29 April 2022 in order to avoid a clash with Charan's other film RRR.

Home media 
The satellite rights were acquired by Gemini TV while the digital distribution rights were acquired by Amazon Prime Video. The film premiered on Amazon Prime Video on 20 May 2022 in Telugu along with dubbed versions in Tamil, Malayalam and Kannada languages.

Reception

Box office
On its opening day, Acharya grossed  crore worldwide with a distributor's share of  crore. In three days, the film grossed  crore, taking its distributor's share to  crore. By the end of its theatrical run, the film collected  crore gross worldwide with a distributor's share of  crore. News18 Telugu estimated that the losses of the film amount to  crore from its theatrical business, making it a commercial failure.

Critical response
Acharya met with generally negative reviews from critics, who criticized the weak narrative and outdated screenplay. Neeshita Nyayapati of The Times of India gave the film a rating of 2.5/5 and wrote "Acharya lacks the soul it needed to pull off a tale that banks too much on people connecting to the concept of dharma". Janani K of India Today gave the film a rating of 2.5/5 and wrote "Acharya is an outdated story that talks about dharma, illegal mining and the importance of our roots. The father-son duo tried their best to keep things interesting". A Reviewer from The Hans India gave the film a rating of 2.25/5 and wrote "‘Acharya’ movie is an outdated story and is further ruined by an unimpressive narration from Koratala Siva".

Medabayani Balakrishna of News 18 gave the film a rating of 1.5/5 and wrote "The sloppy play with the routine scenes, the boring treatment and the weak sequences are the minus points for this movie. Manoj Kumar R of The Indian Express gave the film a rating of 1/5 and wrote "The writing is so poor that even the two actors' massive stardom feels inadequate to lift this movie. It's a snooze fest". Sangeetha Devi Dundoo of The Hindu stated "The playoffs between Chiranjeevi and Ram Charan are endearing, but the film is utterly boring". Sowmya Rajendran of The News Minute gave the film a rating of 1/5 and wrote "It is puzzling how director Koratala Siva managed to achieve this casting coup with such a tedious storyline".

References

External links 
 
 Acharya Trailer at YouTube

2022 action drama films
2020s Telugu-language films
Film productions suspended due to the COVID-19 pandemic
Films about corruption in India
Films directed by Koratala Siva
Films involved in plagiarism controversies
Films scored by Mani Sharma
Films set in Andhra Pradesh
Films shot at Ramoji Film City
Films shot in Hyderabad, India
Films shot in Rajahmundry
Indian action drama films
Films shot in Andhra Pradesh